The  is a Gymnasium in Neuss, North Rhine-Westphalia, Germany.

The eponym is Alexander von Humboldt (1769–1859). The school has approximately 100 teachers and 950 students.

External links 
 Official website of 

Schools in North Rhine-Westphalia

Neuss
Gymnasiums in Germany
Educational institutions established in 1966
1966 establishments in West Germany